Empis bistortae is a species of dance flies, in the fly family Empididae. It is included in the subgenus Anacrostichus. It is found from the Benelux, south to the Iberian Peninsula and east to Ukraine. It is not found in Italy and on the Balkan Peninsula.

References

External links
Fauna Europaea

Empis
Asilomorph flies of Europe
Insects described in 1804